Chunksaah Records is an Asbury Park, New Jersey, formerly New Brunswick, New Jersey-based independent record label founded in 1993 by The Bouncing Souls. The label started as a means for the band to release their own recordings, but ended up releasing material by other punk bands, mostly from the New Jersey area, as well. It is named after a benefactor, Timmy Chunks.

The label issues new material and vinyl re-releases. For example, The Bouncing Souls' The Gold Record was released on CD by Epitaph Records but Chunksaah released the vinyl album.

Artists
Below is a list of notable artists that have released material through Chunksaah:

 The Bouncing Souls
 Adrenalin O.D.
 Tim Barry
 Seaside Caves
 Smalltalk
 Roger Harvey
 The Low Budgets
 The Arsons
 Madcap
 Worthless United
 Wanted Dead
 J Church
 The Plungers
 Spanish Bombs
 The Loved Ones
 Luther
 The Mighty Mighty Bosstones
 Paint It Black
 Static Radio NJ
 Sticks and Stones
 Strike Anywhere
 Vision
 The World/Inferno Friendship Society
 Zero Zero
 Let It Burn
 The Measure S.A.
 Off With Their Heads
 The Great Explainer
 Pacer
 The Explosion

References

External links
 Official site

American independent record labels
Record labels established in 1993
Punk record labels
Asbury Park, New Jersey